Leucidia is a genus of butterflies in the family Pieridae. They are native to the South America.

Species
 Leucidia brephos (Hübner, [1809])
 Leucidia elvina (Godart, 1819)

References

External links

 

Coliadinae
Pieridae genera
Taxa named by Edward Alexander Preble